Hylephila is a genus of skippers in the family Hesperiidae.

Species
The ignorans species group
Hylephila adriennae MacNeill & Herrera, 1998
Hylephila ignorans (Plötz, 1883)
The venusta species group
Hylephila kenhaywardi MacNeill, 1998
Hylephila lamasi MacNeill & Herrera, 1998
Hylephila venustus (Hayward, 1940)
The boulleti species group
Hylephila blancasi MacNeill, 2002
Hylephila boulleti (Mabille, 1906)
Hylephila galera Evans, 1955
Hylephila herrerai MacNeill, 2002
Hylephila pallisteri MacNeill, 2002
Hylephila peruana Draudt, 1923
Hylephila pseudoherrerai MacNeill, 2002
Hylephila rossi MacNeill, 2002
Hylephila shapiroi MacNewil, 2002
Hylephila tentativa MacNeill, 2002
The phyleus species group
Hylephila phyleus (Drury, [1773])
Unknown species group
Hylephila ancora (Plötz, 1883)
Hylephila fasciolata (Blanchard, 1852)
Hylephila isonira Dyar, 1913
Hylephila signata (Blanchard, 1852)
Hylephila zapala Evans, 1955

References
Natural History Museum Lepidoptera genus database
Hylephila at funet

Hesperiini
Hesperiidae genera